Maria Ignatievna von Budberg-Bönninghausen (Maria (Moura) Ignatievna Zakrevskaya-Benckendorff-Budberg, née Zakrevskaya; February 1892 – 1 November 1974) — also known as Countess von Benckendorff and Baroness von Budberg — was a Russian adventuress and suspected double agent of the Soviet Union secret police (OGPU) and British Intelligence Service. 

According to British journalist Robin Bruce Lockhart, who knew her personally, "she was, perhaps, the Soviet Union's most effective agent-of-influence ever to appear on London's political and intellectual stage".

Biography

Early life
Born in Poltava, in central Ukraine, Moura was the daughter of Ignaty Platonovich Zakrevsky (1839–1906), a member of the Russian nobility and diplomat. In 1911, she married Count Johann (Ivan) Alexandrovich von Benckendorff (1882–1919), a member of the Baltic German nobility, Second Secretary at the Russian Embassy in Berlin, and Gentleman of the Court. They had two children: Paul (born in 1913) and Tatiana (born in 1915), who later married Bernard Alexander and became the mother of the businesswoman Helen Alexander. Benckendorff owned a large country house and estate in Estonia, Jendel Jäneda, where he was shot dead on 19 April 1919 by a local peasant.

Arrest
Before the October Revolution, Moura worked in the Russian embassy in Berlin, where she became acquainted with British diplomat R. H. Bruce Lockhart. Upon the assassination of her husband in 1919, she was arrested on suspicion of spying for the United Kingdom and was transferred to the Lubyanka prison. Lockhart, who mentioned her under her given name in his 1932 book Memoirs of a British Agent, tried to vouch for her but was detained as well for a couple of weeks. They had been lovers and she became pregnant by him, but the pregnancy miscarried. (Lockhart's book was made into an American movie in 1934, British Agent,  in which he was played by Leslie Howard ("Stephen Locke") and she by Kay Francis ("Elena Moura").  

After Lockhart was released and expelled from Russia soon afterward in connection with the "Ambassadorial Conspiracy" affair (also known as the "Lockhart Plot"), Budberg was released as well under the condition that she would co-operate with the intelligence service if the need ever arose. Budberg began to publish "World Literature", where she met the writer Maxim Gorky with the help of Korney Chukovsky. She became a secretary and common-law wife of Gorky, living in his house with a few interruptions from 1920 to 1933 when the writer lived in Italy before returning to the Soviet Union. He dedicated his last major work, the novel The Life of Klim Samgin, to her.

H. G. Wells
In 1920, Budberg met British author H. G. Wells when he made a celebrated visit to Moscow and they became lovers. She was briefly married, on 13 November 1921, to Baron Nikolai (Rotger Emil Arthur Friedrich) von Budberg-Bönningshausen (born 1896). The union was in the nature of a marriage of convenience, and they soon divorced. (It provided her with a passport, however, and thus an ability to leave Russia to visit both her children in Estonia and Gorky, who then lived near Sorrento. It is said that the Baron Budberg, a shady character, eventually disappeared in Brazil.) Moura's relationship with Wells was renewed in 1933 in London, where she had emigrated after parting with Gorky. The close relationship continued until Wells's death in 1946. He had asked her to marry him, but Budberg strongly rejected the proposal.

Double agent?
Budberg was widely suspected of being a double agent for both the Soviet Union and British intelligence and has been called the "Mata Hari of Russia", after the famous Dutch exotic dancer and accused spy. She is known to have visited the Soviet Union at least twice after the 1920s: first in 1936 for the funeral of Gorky (which made people call her an agent of the NKVD) and again at the end of 1950, with a daughter of Alexander Guchkov.

An MI5 informant said of her, "she can drink an amazing quantity, mostly gin".

Writing career
Among many other activities, Budberg wrote books and was the script writer for at least two films: Three Sisters (1970), directed by Laurence Olivier and John Sichel, and The Sea Gull (1968), directed by Sidney Lumet. She translated Gorky's novel The Life of a Useless Man (1908) into English in 1971.

Moura Budberg maintained residences in London at Ennismore Gardens and in Cromwell Road. She had made her permanent home in England from the time she emigrated there in 1929 until shortly before her death (31 October 1974), when she returned to Italy.

Family
Budberg's older half-sister, Alexandra 'Alla' Ignatievna Zakrevskaya (1887–1960), who married Baron Arthur von Engelhardt (1875-1909) in 1908 but divorced in 1909, was the great-grandmother of Nick Clegg, the leader of the British Liberal Democratic Party between December 2007 and May 2015, and Deputy Prime Minister of the United Kingdom from 2010 to 2015.

Legacy
In May 2008 a television film, My Secret Agent Auntie, directed by Dimitri Collingridge, was released in England. Her biography was written by Nina Berberova, who chronicled the émigrés.

References

Further reading

 The Murder of Maxim Gorky. A Secret Execution by Arkady Vaksberg. (Enigma Books: New York, 2007. .)
Translated Penguin Book – at  Penguin First Editions reference site of early first edition Penguin Books.

External links
 A Very Dangerous Woman: the Lives, Loves and Lies of Russia’s Most Seductive Spy by Deborah McDonald and Jeremy Dronfield, review: 'unnecessarily portentous'

1892 births
1974 deaths
Russian nobility
Year of birth uncertain
Writers from Poltava
People from Saint Petersburg
Soviet spies
British spies against the Soviet Union
British spies for the Soviet Union